Dharmesh Darshan is an Indian filmmaker, film director and writer who works in Bollywood.

Early life
Dharmesh was born Dharmesh Sabharwal, the son of film producer Darshan Sabharwal by his wife Sheila, who is the elder sister of filmmakers Mahesh Bhatt and Mukesh Bhatt. Thus, both his parents were linked to the Hindi film industry. At some point, Dharmesh decided to adopt his father's first name as his own surname, and came to be known as Dharmesh Darshan. He began his illustrious career as one of the youngest filmmakers of Indian Cinema, in the league of Sooraj Barjatya, Aditya Chopra, Karan Johar, and Sanjay Leela Bhansali. He made box-office history with Raja Hindustani,  when he was only 28. He was widely reputed for being a 'heroine's director' responsible for the metamorphosis of top heroines like Juhi Chawla (Lootere), Karisma Kapoor (Raja Hindustani) and Shilpa Shetty (in Dhadkan).

Biography
He made his directional debut with Lootere (1993), at the age of 24. he had also written the screenplay. The film was produced by his brother Suneel Darshan and was successful at the box office.

In 1996, he made his second film in a big way with Raja Hindustani, starring Aamir Khan and Karisma Kapoor. The movie was the biggest hit of that year as well as one of the biggest blockbusters of the 90s and is also the 4th biggest box office hit of 100 years of Indian cinema (Bollywood) as of 2019. It was also much appreciated as Darshan won the Filmfare Best Movie Award and several awards at the Star Screen Awards ceremony.

He took a break of four years after the success of Raja Hindustani. He returned in 2000 with two releases, which were directed and written by himself. Mela starring again Aamir Khan with his real-life younger brother, Faisal Khan, was a disaster at the box office and is considered to be one of the worst films of Aamir Khan's career. Dhadkan with Akshay Kumar and Shilpa Shetty did very well at the box office and was the fourth biggest hit that year. The movie won him acclaim . Dhadkan was also critically acclaimed and received many award nominations in the Best Director, Best Film and the Best Story categories, apart from resurrecting the flagging career and image of Akshay Kumar and Shilpa Shetty.

His next release Haan Maine Bhi Pyaar Kiya (2002) starring Karisma Kapoor and Abhishek Bachchan was inspired by the 1981 film Ek Hi Bhool and was panned though it was profitable.

The 2005 Bewafaa performed above average at the box office nationwide, and was a major success in the overseas markets.

His last release to date was in 2006. Aap Ki Khatir was a remake of the 2005 American film The Wedding Date. It was a disaster at the box office, despite earning a lot of money musically for its producers Venus.

Awards

|- 
| rowspan=3|1997 
| rowspan=3| Raja Hindustani    
| Filmfare Award for Best Film 
| 
|-
| Star Screen Award for Best Film 
| 
|-
| Star Screen Award for Best Director 
|  
|- 
| 2001     
| Dhadkan 
| Filmfare Award for Best Director 
| 
|- 
|}

Filmography

References

External links
 

1967 births
Living people
Film directors from Mumbai
Hindi-language film directors
Screen Awards winners
20th-century Indian film directors
21st-century Indian film directors